North Springs is an elevated metro station in Sandy Springs, Georgia, and the northern terminus for the Red Line of the Metropolitan Atlanta Rapid Transit Authority (MARTA) rail system. North Springs is primarily a commuter station for Atlanta workers and university students, featuring a large parking deck and direct access on and off State Route 400, a major highway for commuters, so that drivers can avoid surface roads. North Springs attracts commuters from Roswell, Alpharetta and other towns north on State Route 400. As the northern terminus, this station is a hub for buses that continue on north, with connecting bus services to Sandy Springs, the city of Alpharetta, North Point Mall, the city of Roswell, the Ameris Bank Amphitheatre at Encore Park, the Mansell Road and Windward Parkway park-and-rides, and even as far north as the city of Milton. This station also provides bus assistance from North Springs High School via Route 87.

In addition to its direct exit from southbound Georgia 400 and a direct entrance to northbound Georgia 400, there is also a surface street entrance for nearby residents off Peachtree Dunwoody Road NE.  Commuters who enter the station from Georgia 400 south must exit the station via Georgia 400 north, and local commuters entering from Peachtree Dunwoody Road must exit to Peachtree Dunwoody Road.

Furthermore, North Springs features a Zipcar, bicycle racks for up to 14 bikes, and one of only two human cashiers, the other being at the Sandy Springs Station.

Station layout

History
Both The North Springs and Sandy Springs Stations were opened on December 16, 2000 as part of MARTA's most recent expansion, adding two more stations north of the Dunwoody Station.

Parking
North Springs has 2,325 daily and long term parking spaces available for MARTA users which are located in one parking deck. A pedestrian bridge, on the fifth floor, connects the parking deck to nearby apartment complex at Peachtree Dunwoody Ct.

Bus routes
The station is served by the following MARTA bus routes:
 Route 85 - Roswell / Mansell Road
 Route 87 - Roswell Road / Morgan Falls
 Route 140 - North Point Parkway
 Route 141 -  Haynes Bridge Road / Milton
 Route 143 - Windward Park & Ride
 Route 185 - Alpharetta / Old Milton Parkway

Connections to other transit systems
Georgia Regional Transportation Authority Xpress Route 400 - North Springs / Cumming Park-and-Ride

Future
While North Springs has been the Red Line's northern terminus for the longest time in MARTA's history,  almost 20 years as of August 2020, plans are in place to change this. The Georgia 400 Transit Initiative, or Connect 400, is a future plan to further expand the Red Line an additional 11.9 miles to the northern end of Fulton County running on or parallel to Georgia 400. The current plans includes stations at Northridge Road, Holcomb Bridge Road, North Point Mall / Encore Parkway, Old Milton Parkway, and Windward Parkway. The initiative is still in its early stages; it must complete its Environmental Impact Study before it can apply for Federal funding, with an estimated completion date of 2025 given optimal conditions.

References

External links
Station Overview, including video tour
MARTA Guide

Red Line (MARTA)
Metropolitan Atlanta Rapid Transit Authority stations
Railway stations in the United States opened in 2000
Sandy Springs, Georgia
Railway stations in Fulton County, Georgia
2000 establishments in Georgia (U.S. state)